Vasily Grigorievich Artemyev (born 24 July 1987) is a Russian rugby union player for CSKA Moscow. He plays as wing or fullback.

Career

Returning to his native Moscow (Zelenograd) in 2008, he joined professional club VVA and began representing Russia.

Vasily signed for Aviva Premiership side Northampton Saints for the 2011-2012 season, joining them after the conclusion of the 2011 World Cup. On his début for the club he scored a hat-trick in the LV= Cup victory over Saracens, before scoring two tries in his Premiership debut against Newcastle Falcons.

He was a player for Russia, since 2009 to 2022, with 30 tries scored, 170 points on aggregate. He played four games at the 2011 Rugby World Cup, scoring a try against Ireland in a pool game.

References

External links

2011 Rugby World Cup Profile

1987 births
Living people
University College Dublin R.F.C. players
Russian rugby union players
Russia international rugby union players
Sportspeople from Moscow
Russian expatriate rugby union players
Expatriate rugby union players in Ireland
Expatriate rugby union players in England
Russian expatriate sportspeople in Ireland
Russian expatriate sportspeople in England
People educated at Blackrock College
Rugby union fullbacks
People from Zelenograd